Sabina Asenjo Álvarez (born 3 August 1986) is a Spanish athlete whose specialty is the discus throw. She competed at the 2015 World Championships in Beijing without qualifying for the final. Her personal best in the event is 61.89 metres set in Bilbao in 2016. This is the current national record.

Competition record

References

External links

1986 births
Living people
Spanish female discus throwers
World Athletics Championships athletes for Spain
People from Ponferrada
Sportspeople from the Province of León
Athletes (track and field) at the 2016 Summer Olympics
Olympic athletes of Spain
Athletes (track and field) at the 2018 Mediterranean Games
Mediterranean Games competitors for Spain
21st-century Spanish women